Phobolosia is a genus of moths in the family Erebidae. The genus was erected by Harrison Gray Dyar Jr. in 1908.

Taxonomy
The genus was previously classified in the subfamily Acontiinae of the family Noctuidae.

Species
 Phobolosia admirabilis Schaus, 1914
 Phobolosia anfracta H. Edwards, 1881
 Phobolosia argentifera Hampson, 1918
 Phobolosia atrifrons Schaus, 1914
 Phobolosia aurilinea Schaus, 1912
 Phobolosia duomaculata Barnes & Benjamin, 1925
 Phobolosia medialis Hampson, 1918
 Phobolosia micralis Hampson, 1918
 Phobolosia mydronotum Dyar, 1914

References

Scolecocampinae
Moth genera